Bølgen (Danish "The Wave") is a modern residential building complex by the Skyttehus bay in Vejle, Denmark. It is inspired by the Sydney Opera House by Danish architect Jørn Utzon and the hilly landscape around Vejle Fjord.

It has been named as a ground-breaking architecture piece in modern times and a significant landmark of Vejle.

Awards
In 2010 The Wave in Vejle and Henning Larsen Architects won the prestigious architectural prize LEAF Awards in the ’multiple occupancy’ category. The project also won the annual 'Vejle Award' as 2010 Building of the Year. In 2011 the project won at Civic Trust Awards, that was initiated in 1959 in England to honour the best in architecture, design and planning etc.

References 

Apartment buildings in Denmark
Buildings and structures in Vejle Municipality
Vejle